Viettel Tanzania Public Limited Company, trading as Halotel, is a mobile communications company, providing voice, messaging, data and communication services in Tanzania. It is owned by Viettel Global JSC which is the state-owned Investment Company from Vietnam investing in the Telecommunications market in several countries worldwide. It has invested up to $1 Billion into the Tanzania's telecommunications market. The Company was the first company in Tanzania allowed to lay its own fiber optic cable and has placed over 18,000 km of optic fibers, providing all 26 regions of Tanzania services.

The Tanzanian telecom market is one of the most competitive markets in Africa and Tanzania has over 79% mobile phone penetration. The company aims to capitalize on the providing a very wide coverage as quickly as possible and the company claims to cover over 81% of the country's area soon to be the higher than any of the major providers.

History 
Halotel was launched in October 2015 and deployed in all 26 Tanzanian regions. This was Viettel's fourth investment in Africa after Movitel, Lumitel and Nexttel in Mozambique, Burundi and Cameroon respectively. Viettel started investing in the country in 2011 and planned $736 million in investment after the then president Jakaya Kikwete made a state visit to Vietnam. The goal of the government was to encourage rural mobile connectivity in the country where and the government saw fit to increase competition by allowing Viettel to operate in the country.

The entry of Viettel also saw further liberalization of the communication sector, where the government allowed private companies to lay their own optic fiber cables. The company had promised to connect several public institutions around the country with the optic fibre network and connect over 1500 villages to the telecommunication grid that were previously not served. The company also tried to partner with state-owned energy company Tanzania Electric Supply Company Limited (TANESCO) to use TANESCO's power poles to serve as antennas, however due to high costs the plan was abandoned.

The company has successfully obtained licenses to operate its mobile money services HALOPESA to help it compete with Tanzania's well established operators.

Viettel Group 

Viettel Group is a Vietnam based telecommunications group. It is a state-owned enterprise wholly owned and operated by the Ministry of Defence of Vietnam. The company has a customer base of over 75 million as of 2014 and made over $8 billion in revenue. ,the Group has subsidiaries in:

See also

Telecommunications in Tanzania
Tanzania Communication Regulatory Authority

References

External links 

Telecommunications companies of Tanzania
2015 establishments in Tanzania
Telecommunications companies established in 2015
Mobile phone companies of Tanzania